is a JR West railway station located in Shimonoseki city, Yamaguchi Prefecture, Japan. People who disembark at Kottoi Station can take a 20-minute bus ride to Tsunoshima via the Tsunoshima Bridge, a  bridge that joins Tsunoshima to the mainland at Hōhoku Town. It was the longest toll free bridge in Japan when it was completed on November 3, 2000.

Station layout
Kottoi Station is housed in its original wooden-framed station building.  It is a one-track, single platform station.  Because of this single line structure, trains bound for Nagatoshi Station as well as Kogushi Station stop at the same platform. Previously the platform had a side track, allowing trains that were traveling in different directions to pass one another, however this  was discontinued in 1970. The station is run by the Nagato Railroad Bureau. Though there are no staff members at the station, some tickets can be purchased from a small shop in front of the station. As there is a difference in height of a few meters between the station building and the platform, there is a staircase to the platform which crosses over the old track. There is a waiting room on the platform side of the station building, but there is no door. The station is located considerably higher than the village it serves.

History
9 September 1928 - The extension of the Japanese National Rail Kogushi Line, as it was then known, from Takibe Station to Agawa Station, is completed.  Services for passenger and freight trains commence.
24 February 1933 - The Kogushi Line is incorporated into the San'in Main Line.
1 August 1961 - The service of freight trains is cancelled.
1 April 1987 - Under the privatisation of Japan's railways, Kottoi Station becomes part of the West Japan Railway Company.

Etymology
The origin of the area name Kottoi has been addressed in various media, particularly as a station name which is difficult to read by Japanese standards. There are two ideas about the origin of the place name. The first comes from the regional way for expressing the word  as kottoi. It is also said to mean "a robust cow that will bear a heavy load".

Platforms

Lines
The following lines pass through or terminate at Takibe Station:
West Japan Railway Company
San'in Main Line

Local area
Kottoi Fishing Harbour
Tsunoshima was also connected via  which also had a connecting bus service. Now there is a direct bus to the island.
Japan National Route 435

Bus line
Blue Line Bus Service

User statistics
Below are the average number of people who alight at Kottoi Station per day.
1999 - 105
2000 - 91
2001 - 63
2002 - 64
2003 - 67
2004 - 58
2005 - 53
2006 - 41
2007 - 32
2008 - 36
2009 - 31
2010 - 34

References

External links
Kottoi Station (JR West) 

Railway stations in Japan opened in 1928
Railway stations in Yamaguchi Prefecture
Sanin Main Line
Stations of West Japan Railway Company